The following outline is provided as an overview of and topical guide to Tunisia:

Tunisia – northernmost country in Africa situated on the southern coast of the Mediterranean Sea. Tunisia is the smallest of the nations situated along the Atlas mountain range. In ancient times, Tunisia was the home of the famous Phoenician city of Carthage.

General reference 
 Common English country name:  Tunisia
 Official English country name:  The Tunisian Republic
 Adjectival(s): Tunisian
 Etymology: Name of Tunisia
 International rankings of Tunisia
 ISO country codes:  TN, TUN, 788
 ISO region codes:  See ISO 3166-2:TN
 Internet country code top-level domain:  .tn

Geography of Tunisia 

Geography of Tunisia
 Tunisia is: a country
 Location
 Tunisia is situated within the following regions:
 Northern Hemisphere and Eastern Hemisphere
 Africa
 Sahara Desert
 North Africa
 Maghreb
 Time zone:  UTC+01
 Extreme points of Tunisia
 High:  Jebel ech Chambi 
 Low:  Shatt al Gharsah 
 Land boundaries:  1,424 km
 965 km
 459 km
 Coastline:  Mediterranean Sea 1,148 km
 Population of Tunisia: 10,327,000  – 79th most populous country

 Area of Tunisia: 163610 km2
 Atlas of Tunisia

Environment of Tunisia 

 Climate of Tunisia
 Ecoregions in Tunisia
 Protected areas of Tunisia
 Biosphere reserves in Tunisia
 National parks of Tunisia
 Wildlife of Tunisia
 Fauna of Tunisia
 Birds of Tunisia
 Mammals of Tunisia

Natural geographic features of Tunisia 

 Cap Bon (also known as Sharik Peninsula)
 Ras ben Sakka (northernmost point of Africa)
 Strait of Sicily
 World Heritage Sites in Tunisia

Gulfs of Tunisia 

 Gulf of Gabès
 Gulf of Hammamet
 Gulf of Tunis

Islands of Tunisia 
 Djerba
 Galite Islands
 Kerkennah Islands
 Chergui
 Gharbi
 Zembra

Lakes of Tunisia 

 Ichkeul Lake
 Lake Tritonis (former lake)
 Lake of Tunis (lagoon)
 Tunisian salt lakes
 Chott el Djerid (salt lake)

Mountains of Tunisia 
 Atlas Mountains
 Aurès Mountains
 Jebel ech Chambi (highest mountain in Tunisia–)
 Djebel Zaghouan

Rivers of Tunisia 
 Medjerda River (longest river of Tunisia)

Regions of Tunisia

Ecoregions of Tunisia

Administrative divisions of Tunisia 

Subdivisions of Tunisia
 Governorates of Tunisia
 Lists of Tunisian governorates
 List of Tunisian governorates (sortable)
 List of Tunisian governorates by area
 List of Tunisian governorates by creation date
 List of Tunisian governorates by population
 Delegations of Tunisia

Governorates of Tunisia 

Governorates of Tunisia
Ariana
Béja
Ben Arous
Bizerte
Gabès
Gafsa
Jendouba
Kairouan
Kasserine
Kebili
Kef
Mahdia
Manouba
Medenine
Monastir
Nabeul
Sfax
Sidi Bouzid
Siliana
Sousse
Tataouine
Tozeur
Tunis
Zaghouan

Delegations of Tunisia 

Delegations of Tunisia
The governorates of Tunisia are divided into 262 "delegations" or "districts" (mutamadiyat).

Settlements 

List of cities in Tunisia
 Tunis (capital city, most populous city)
 Sfax

Demography of Tunisia 

Demographics of Tunisia
 Berber Jews
History of the Jews in Tunisia
 Mrazig

Government and politics of Tunisia 

Politics of Tunisia
 Form of government: unitary semi-presidential representative democratic republic
 Capital of Tunisia: Tunis
 Elections in Tunisia
 2010–2011 Tunisian uprising

Branches of the government of Tunisia 

Government of Tunisia

Executive branch of the government of Tunisia 
 Head of state: President of Tunisia, Kais Saied
 Head of government: Prime Minister of Tunisia, Najla Bouden Romdhane 
 Cabinet of Tunisia
 Ministries of Tunisia
 Ministry of Communication Technologies
 Ministry of Foreign Affairs
 Ministry of Regional Development

Legislative branch of the government of Tunisia 

 Parliament of Tunisia: Assembly of the Representatives of the People (unicameral since 2014)

Judicial branch of the government of Tunisia 

Court system of Tunisia
 Court of Cassation – highest court of Tunisia.

Foreign relations of Tunisia 

Foreign relations of Tunisia
 Diplomatic missions in Tunisia
 Diplomatic missions of Tunisia
 Tunisia Monitoring Group
 Tunisia – United States relations

International organization membership 
The Tunisian Republic is a member of:

African Development Bank Group (AfDB)
African Union (AU)
Arab Bank for Economic Development in Africa (ABEDA)
Arab Fund for Economic and Social Development (AFESD)
Arab Maghreb Union (AMU)
Arab Monetary Fund (AMF)
Black Sea Economic Cooperation Zone (BSEC) (observer)
European Bank for Reconstruction and Development (EBRD)
Food and Agriculture Organization (FAO)
Group of 77 (G77)
International Atomic Energy Agency (IAEA)
International Bank for Reconstruction and Development (IBRD)
International Chamber of Commerce (ICC)
International Civil Aviation Organization (ICAO)
International Criminal Police Organization (Interpol)
International Development Association (IDA)
International Federation of Red Cross and Red Crescent Societies (IFRCS)
International Finance Corporation (IFC)
International Fund for Agricultural Development (IFAD)
International Hydrographic Organization (IHO)
International Labour Organization (ILO)
International Maritime Organization (IMO)
International Mobile Satellite Organization (IMSO)
International Monetary Fund (IMF)
International Olympic Committee (IOC)
International Organization for Migration (IOM)
International Organization for Standardization (ISO)
International Red Cross and Red Crescent Movement (ICRM)
International Telecommunication Union (ITU)

International Telecommunications Satellite Organization (ITSO)
International Trade Union Confederation (ITUC)
Inter-Parliamentary Union (IPU)
Islamic Development Bank (IDB)
League of Arab States (LAS)
Multilateral Investment Guarantee Agency (MIGA)
Nonaligned Movement (NAM)
Organisation internationale de la Francophonie (OIF)
Organisation of Islamic Cooperation (OIC)
Organization for Security and Cooperation in Europe (OSCE) (partner)
Organisation for the Prohibition of Chemical Weapons (OPCW)
Organization of American States (OAS) (observer)
Organization of Arab Petroleum Exporting Countries (OAPEC) (suspended)
United Nations (UN)
United Nations Conference on Trade and Development (UNCTAD)
United Nations Educational, Scientific, and Cultural Organization (UNESCO)
United Nations High Commissioner for Refugees (UNHCR)
United Nations Industrial Development Organization (UNIDO)
United Nations Operation in Cote d'Ivoire (UNOCI)
United Nations Organization Mission in the Democratic Republic of the Congo (MONUC)
Universal Postal Union (UPU)
World Customs Organization (WCO)
World Federation of Trade Unions (WFTU)
World Health Organization (WHO)
World Intellectual Property Organization (WIPO)
World Meteorological Organization (WMO)
World Tourism Organization (UNWTO)
World Trade Organization (WTO)

Law and order in Tunisia 

Law of Tunisia
 Constitution of Tunisia
 Crime in Tunisia
 Polygamy in Tunisia
 Prostitution in Tunisia (mostly ignored)
 Human rights in Tunisia
 Code of Personal Status
 LGBT rights in Tunisia
 Freedom of speech in Tunisia
 Censorship in Tunisia
 Internet censorship in Tunisia
 Tunisia Monitoring Group
 Law enforcement in Tunisia
 Tunisian National Guard
 Tunisian Police 
 Tunisian passports
 Visa requirements for Tunisian citizens
 Speed limits in Tunisia

Military of Tunisia 

Military of Tunisia
 Command
 Commander-in-chief:
 Ministry of Defence of Tunisia
 Forces
 Army of Tunisia
 Navy of Tunisia
 Air Force of Tunisia
 Military history of Tunisia

Political parties in Tunisia 

List of political parties in Tunisia
 Congress for the Republic
 Constitutional Democratic Rally
 Democratic Forum for Labour and Liberties
 Democratic Modernist Pole
 Destour
 Ennahda Movement
 Movement of Socialist Democrats
 Neo Destour
 Party of People's Unity
 Popular Petition
 Progressive Democratic Party
 Social Liberal Party
 Socialist Destourian Party
 Tunisian Communist Party
 Tunisian Workers' Communist Party
 Unionist Democratic Union

Politicians of Tunisia 
 List of presidents of Tunisia
 Habib Bourguiba
 Zine El Abidine Ben Ali
 Prime Minister of Tunisia
 Hédi Baccouche
 Zine El Abidine Ben Ali
 Mohamed Ghannouchi
 Hamed Karoui
 Mohammed Mzali
 Hedi Amara Nouira
 Rachid Sfar

Local government in Tunisia 

Local government in Tunisia

History of Tunisia 

History of Tunisia
 History of North Africa

By period 
 History of early Tunisia
 History of Carthage
 Carthage
 Carthago delenda est
 History of Roman-era Tunisia / Africa (Roman province)
 Diocese of Africa
 History of early Islamic Tunisia
 History of medieval Tunisia
 Ifriqiya
 Ottoman Tunisia
 Barbary pirates
 Barbary slave trade
 History of French-era Tunisia
 French conquest of Tunisia
 Treaty of Bardo (1881)
 French protectorate of Tunisia
 Tunisia during World War II
 Tunisia Campaign
 History of modern Tunisia
 Arab Islamic Republic – proposed Libya-Tunisia union, 1974
 Tunisian Revolution
 2013–14 Tunisian protests

By subject

Dynasties of Tunisia 
 Aghlabids
 Fatimid Caliphate
 Zirid Dynasty
 Almohad Caliphate
 Hafsid dynasty
 Husainid Dynasty
 List of Beys of Tunis

Economic history of Tunisia 
 Second Tunisia Plan
 Third Tunisia Plan
 Fourth Tunisia Plan
 Fifth Tunisia Plan
 Sixth Tunisia Plan
 Seventh Tunisia Plan
 Ninth Tunisia Plan

Military history of Tunisia 
 Battle of Adys (255 BC)
 Battle of Tunis (255 BC)
 Battle of the Great Plains (203 BC)
 Battle of Zama (202 BC)
 Battle of Carthage (c. 149 BC)
 Battle of Ruspina (46 BC)
 Battle of Thapsus (46 BC)
 Battle of Carthage (238)
 Vandalic War (533–534)
 Battle of Ad Decimum (533)
 Battle of Tricamarum (533)
 Battle of Carthage (698)
 Mahdia campaign (1087)
 Conquest of Tunis (1535)
 Battle of Djerba (1560)
 Barbary Wars
 First Barbary War (1801–1805)
 Second Barbary War (1815)
 Battle of Cape Bon (1941)
 Tunisia Campaign (1942–1943)
 Tunisian independence (1952–1956)
 Operation Wooden Leg (1985)

Culture of Tunisia 

Culture of Tunisia
 Languages of Tunisia
 Northern Berber languages
 Sened language (extinct)
 Shilha language
 Tunisian Arabic
 Museums in Tunisia
 National symbols of Tunisia
 Coat of arms of Tunisia
 Flag of Tunisia
 National anthem of Tunisia (Humat al-Hima)
 Nichan Iftikhar (order)
 People of Tunisia
Italian Tunisians
 Prostitution in Tunisia
 Public holidays in Tunisia
 Recreation in Tunisia
 Caving in Tunisia
 World Heritage Sites in Tunisia

Arts in Tunisia 
 Art in Tunisia
 Tunisian collaborative painting
 Cinema of Tunisia
 List of Tunisian films
 Literature of Tunisia
 Music of Tunisia
 Checkpoint 303
 Mezwed
 Tunisia in the Eurovision Song Contest
 Tunisian underground music
 Television in Tunisia
 Theatre in Tunisia
 National Theatre of Tunisia

Cuisine of Tunisia 

Cuisine of Tunisia
 Brik
 Chermoula
 Couscous
 Harissa
 Lablabi
 Makroudh
 Merguez
 Shakshouka
 Zlebia

Religion in Tunisia 

Religion in Tunisia
 Christianity in Tunisia
 Roman Catholicism in Tunisia
 Hinduism in Tunisia
 Islam in Tunisia
 Judaism in Tunisia

Sports in Tunisia 

Sports in Tunisia
 List of Tunisian records in athletics
 Tunis Sports City
 Basketball in Tunisia
 Tunisia national basketball team
 Tunisia women's national basketball team
 Football in Tunisia
 Tunisian Football Federation
 Tunisian Coupe de la Ligue Professionnelle
 Tunisian Ligue Professionnelle 1
 Tunisian Ligue Professionnelle 2
 Tunisian Ligue Professionnelle 3
 Tunisia national football team
 Tunisia women's national football team
 Tunisian President Cup
 Tunisia national futsal team
 Handball in Tunisia
 Tunisia men's national handball team
 Tunisia women's national handball team
 Tunisia at the Mediterranean Games
 Tunisia at the 2005 Mediterranean Games
 Tunisia at the 2009 Mediterranean Games
 Tunisia at the Olympics
 Tunisia at the 1960 Summer Olympics
 Tunisia at the 1964 Summer Olympics
 Tunisia at the 1968 Summer Olympics
 Tunisia at the 1972 Summer Olympics
 Tunisia at the 1976 Summer Olympics
 Tunisia at the 1984 Summer Olympics
 Tunisia at the 1988 Summer Olympics
 Tunisia at the 1992 Summer Olympics
 Tunisia at the 1996 Summer Olympics
 Tunisia at the 2000 Summer Olympics
 Tunisia at the 2004 Summer Olympics
 Tunisia at the 2008 Summer Olympics
 Tunisia at the Paralympics
 Tunisia at the 2004 Summer Paralympics
 Tunisia at the 2008 Summer Paralympics
 Tunisia at the 2009 World Championships in Athletics
 Tunisia at the 2010 Summer Youth Olympics
 Rugby union in Tunisia
 Tunisia national rugby union team
 Tunisia national rugby sevens team
 Tunisian Rugby Federation
 Tunisia men's national volleyball team
 Tunisia men's national water polo team
 Tennis in Tunisia
 Tunis Open
 Tunisia Davis Cup team
 Tunisia Fed Cup team

Economy and infrastructure of Tunisia 

Economy of Tunisia
 Economic rank, by nominal GDP (2007): 77th (seventy-seventh)
 Banking in Tunisia
 Central Bank of Tunisia
 List of banks in Tunisia
 Communications in Tunisia
 Internet in Tunisia
 Internet censorship in Tunisia
 Tunisian Internet Agency
 Telephone numbers in Tunisia
 Companies of Tunisia
 Entreprise Tunisienne d'Activités Pétrolières (state-owned)
 Numhyd
 Tunisian Railways
 Tunisiana (owned by Orascom Telecom Holding)
Currency of Tunisia: Dinar
 Tunisian duro
ISO 4217: TND
 Economic history of Tunisia
 Energy in Tunisia
 Health care in Tunisia
 Mining in Tunisia
 Stock exchange: Bourse de Tunis
 Tourism in Tunisia
 Trade unions in Tunisia
 Confédération Générale des Travailleurs Tunisiens
 Tunisian General Labour Union
 Union Syndicale des Travailleurs de Tunisie
 Union des Travailleurs Tunisiens
 Transport in Tunisia
 Air transport in Tunisia
 Airlines in Tunisia
 Karthago Airlines
 Nouvelair
 Sevenair
 SBA Airlines (planned)
 Tunisair
 Airports in Tunisia
 Borj El Amri Airport
 Djerba–Zarzis International Airport
 Monastir – Habib Bourguiba International Airport
 Tozeur–Nefta International Airport
 Sfax–Thyna International Airport
 Tunis–Carthage International Airport
 Enfidha – Hammamet International Airport
 Rail transport in Tunisia
 Railway stations in Tunisia
 List of Tunis Metro stations
 Métro léger de Tunis
 Société des transports de Tunis
 TGM
 Roads in Tunisia
 Speed limits in Tunisia
 Water supply and sanitation in Tunisia

Education in Tunisia 

Education in Tunisia
 List of schools in Tunisia
 List of universities in Tunisia

See also 

Tunisia
Index of Tunisia-related articles
List of international rankings
Member state of the United Nations
Outline of Africa
Outline of geography

References

External links 

 
  Tunisia Government official site
 BBC News Country Profile – Tunisia
 Encyclopædia Britannica, Tunisia – Country Page
 CIA World Factbook – Tunisia
 

Tunisia